SS Charles H. Herty was a Liberty ship built in the United States during World War II.  It was named after American chemist Charles Herty.

References

 

Liberty ships
1943 ships